Dr Julian Bennett is a British archeologist.

After leaving secondary school, Dr Julian Bennett worked as a freelance archaeologist in England and Germany, before entering the University of Durham as a mature student where he graduated with a BA (Hons) in Archaeology in 1978. After preliminary graduate study at Newcastle University, he was appointed as an Excavations Director for English Heritage, continuing with graduate studies on a part-time basis to eventually be awarded his PhD in 1991. The title of his PhD thesis was The Setting, Development and Function of the Hadrianic Frontier in Britain. From 1985 to 1995, Bennett worked for a New York travel company, guiding for institutions such as the Smithsonian and the Metropolitan Museum of Art, and working as Tour Leader and Archaeological Guide Lecturer on boat cruises around Europe and Scandinavia, the Mediterranean World, and South America.

In 1995 Bennett became a professor at Bilkent University in Ankara. His areas of expertise are: provincial and military Roman archeology, late Roman and Byzantine architecture in Turkey, the Roman Empire and the Roman army and the study of Late Antique and Medieval architecture. He has published numerous monographs and articles on various aspects of Roman and Medieval Britain and the Roman army, and is the author of two books, Towns in Roman Britain (1980) and Trajan. Optimus Princeps. A Life And Times (1997). The latter has been translated into Romanian and Russian.

Bennett's fieldwork experience extends from rural and urban salvage excavations in Britain, Romania, and Germany to his current research project, studying the architecture of the Moldavian and Ottoman castle of Belgorod-Akkerman, in the Ukraine. He was elected a Fellow of the Society of Antiquaries of London in 2002, becoming only the third person in Turkey to receive that distinction. Bennett has appeared in many TV documentaries for the BBC, The History Channel and National Geographic.

Julian has one daughter, Laura I. H. Bennett (b. 1984) and two sons, Alexander Shah Whitham Bennett(b. 2006), Arthur Kaan Whitham Bennett(b. 2009).

Works 
 Trajan. Optimus Princeps. A Life And Times. 1997, 2. edition, Routledge, London 2001, .
Towns in Roman Britain. 1980, 4. edition, Shire 2001,

External links 
 website of Julian Bennett at Bilkent University

British archaeologists
Living people
Academic staff of Bilkent University
Alumni of Newcastle University
Year of birth missing (living people)
Fellows of the Society of Antiquaries of London
Alumni of St Cuthbert's Society, Durham